Richard Cachia Caruana KOM (born 11 February 1955) was a prominent office holder in the five Nationalist Party (European People's Party) governments in Malta between 1987 and 2013. He was chief negotiator for Malta's European Union accession negotiations (1999–2003) and later Malta's first permanent representative to the EU (2004–2012). He was chief of staff to Prime Minister Eddie Fenech Adami (1991–1996 and 1998–2004) and adviser to Prime Minister Lawrence Gonzi (2004–2013).

He is the chairman of Citco Custody Ltd, a financial institution, as well as a senior consultant at EMD Malta. He is a former director (and member of monetary policy council) of the Central Bank of Malta (1997–1998), and a former director of Air Malta plc (1992–1997) and the Malta Development Corporation (1987–1996). He is also a former senior consultant at KPMG Malta (1996–1998).

He was appointed a Companion of Malta's National Order of Merit (KOM) in 2006 and is also a member of the Orders of Merit of: Italy (Knight Grand Cross), Spain (Knight Commander), Latvia (Knight Commander), Estonia (Grand Officer), Poland (Knight Commander), Portugal (Grand Officer), and the Sovereign Military Order of Malta (Grand Officer).

References 

Nationalist Party (Malta) politicians
1955 births
Living people
Commanders of the Order of Merit of the Republic of Poland
Recipients of the National Order of Merit (Malta)
Knights Grand Cross of the Order of Merit of the Italian Republic
Grand Officers of the Order of Merit (Portugal)
20th-century Maltese politicians
21st-century Maltese politicians